Love in Jamaica (French: À la Jamaïque) is a 1957 French musical comedy film directed by André Berthomieu and starring Luis Mariano, Jane Sourza and Paquita Rico. It is an operetta film, adapted from a stage work composed by Francis Lopez.

The film's art direction was by Raymond Nègre. It was shot at the Franstudios in Paris.

Cast
 Luis Mariano as Manoël Martinez  
 Jane Sourza as Annie Krüschen  
 Paquita Rico as Olivia de Montana  
 Gisèle Robert  as Gilda  
 Fernand Sardou as Maxime de Sainte-Maxime  
 Darry Cowl as Pater noster  
 Frédéric Duvallès as Simon Legrand  
 Gaston Orbal as Le capitaine  
 Georges Aminel as Pépito  
 Bernard Dumaine 
 Christian Duvaleix
 Maurice Nasil 
 Madeleine Suffel 
 Maurice Teynac 
 Louis Villor 
 Nono Zammit

References

Bibliography 
 Philippe Rège. Encyclopedia of French Film Directors, Volume 1. Scarecrow Press, 2009.

External links 
 

1957 films
1957 musical comedy films
French musical comedy films
1950s French-language films
Films directed by André Berthomieu
Operetta films
1950s French films